Ferenc Németh (26 September 1894 – August 1977) was a Hungarian cross-country skier. He competed at the 1924 Winter Olympics and the 1928 Winter Olympics.

References

External links
 

1894 births
1977 deaths
Hungarian male cross-country skiers
Olympic cross-country skiers of Hungary
Cross-country skiers at the 1924 Winter Olympics
Cross-country skiers at the 1928 Winter Olympics
Place of birth missing
20th-century Hungarian people